Stefan Nilsson may refer to:

 Stefan Nilsson (sport shooter), Swedish sport shooter
 Stefan Nilsson (footballer), Swedish footballer

See also
 Stefan Nielsen (disambiguation)